Virarajendra Chola (1002 CE – 1070 CE) was a Chola emperor, who spent a major part of his life as a subordinate to two of his elder brothers Rajadhiraja I and Rajendra II, he is the son of Rajendra I. During his early reign he granted the maintenance of a school to study the Vedas, Sastras and grammar;  a hostel was provided for the students. A hospital named Virasolan was also provided by him for the sick people. The famous grammatical work in Tamil, Virasoliyam was written by Buddhamitra during his reign.

Virarajendra’s reign occurred in a period when the Chola Empire was both trying to expand its boundaries and preserve its existing territories, but had appeared to stutter in its attempts because of the death of Virarajendra’s eldest brother and king Rajadhiraja I, and the short rule of Virarajendra's elder brother Rajendra II. In total, the three brothers ruled for 16–20 years altogether by succeeding one another. This rapid succession was seen as a golden opportunity by the traditional enemies and subordinates of the Cholas: the Singhalas (Ceylon), the Pandyas and the Chera Perumals, with each adversary either trying to become free or declaring war on the Cholas. Ultimately, Virarajendra proved to be a capable and brave ruler, who was kind and protective to his subjects, who reimposed authority on Chola dominions and was ruthless to the Chalukyas and the Pandyas. Viewed overall, especially in the context of the fact that his own rule lasted for less than 10 years, yet, as borne out by his various inscriptions in Karur, Virarajendra had a lasting legacy in that in the short time he ruled, he overwhelmed everyone of his adversaries, and succeeded not only in preserving Chola territories, but also made overseas conquests in far-off lands such as Indonesia, Malaysia, Sri Lanka and Nicobar.

Early life

He was posted as the Chola viceroy of Sri Lanka by his elder brother Rajadhiraja Chola during the early part of the latter's reign. Next, during the reign of his other elder brother Rajendra Chola II, he served as the Lord of Uraiyur.

Military conflicts

Virarajendra fought many battles against the Western Chalukya Empire, the main catalyst for these conflicts being the Chola interest in the Vengi Chalukyas. He fought the Western  Chalukyas near Visaiyavadai (modern Vijayawada) and routed the Western Chalukyas on the banks of the river Krishna and re-asserted Chola authority over the domains of the Eastern Chalukyas. He also invaded Singhala Nadu (Ceylon) and ruthlessly crushed attempts of the Singhala kings to free their kingdom from Chola control.

Early battles
During the early period of his reign, Virarajendra fought and killed the king of Pottapi, and king of the Kerala (Chera Perumal) country. He also had to suppress a rebellion in the Pandya territories by the Pandya princes. While these battles were progressing, the Western Chalukya Someshvara I invaded the Chola country, the Chola country was there for his taking and he thought he could overcome his earlier humiliation at the hands of Virarajendra's predecessor, Rajendra II.  First, Someshvara I sent his son Vikkalan (Vikramaditya VI) for plundering Gangaikonda Cholapuram, the capital of Virarajendra. Virarajendra was returning after subduing the Pandyas, the Sinhalas and the Chera Perumal kings and making them tribute paying subordinates. He immediately undertook the task of safeguarding the Chola capital and routed Vikramaditya VI from the Chola capital. Next he chased the Chalukya princes Vikramaditya (Vikkalan) and Singhanan at Gangapadi. He completely overwhelmed the Chalukya army led by both princes and sons of Someshvara I and proceeded to the Chalukyan capital. There he routed for the first time Someshvara I who fled the battlefield. The third war fought by Virarajendra against the Chalukyas was when Someshvara I sent his son Vikramaditya VI to occupy Vengi on the presumption that due to the death of his old nemesis Rajendra II, Vengi became subordinate to Western Chalukya rule.  Virarajendra's armies routed the Western Chalukyas at Vengi, after which they surrounded Kalyanpura, the Chalukyan capital and burnt the fortress at Kampili taking precious wealth, the Chief queen of Someshvara I, eliminated his generals and trusted feudatories and took away his horses and prized elephants.

Virarajendra successfully quelled the rebellions at Ceylon, Madurai and the Chera Perumal Kingdom, Potappi and converted the Western Chalukyas (at the seven and a half lakshas of Rattapadi) into tribute paying subordinates.

Continuing Chalukya battles

Virarajendra’s reign is marked by the numerous inscriptions detailing his various victories with the Western Chalukyas. Virarajendra was involved in the battles against the Western Chalukyas even before he became king. Under the command of the then heir to the throne Rajamahendra, Virarajendra fought the Chalukya forces in the battle of Mudakaru. During Virarajendra’s reign, Someshvara, the loser of this battle sought to wipe the disgrace of his defeat at Madukaru and called for battle with the Cholas. On each of the confrontations with the Cholas.  In his inscriptions at Karur and Tindivanam, Virarajendra claims proudly that Someshvara-I's sons Vikramaditya VI (called Vikkalan) and Jayasimha III (called Singhanan) fled the battlefield with dishevelled hair. Virarajendra further claimed that he defeated Someshvara I's armies not less than five times.  These battles took place at Kudalasangamam, Gangaikondacholapuram, Karur, Kampili and Vengi. On each occasion, the generals of Someshvara I like Chamundaraja were beheaded, Maduvana, Vikramaditya VI fled the battlefield with, Jayasimha III, Annala and finally Ahavamalla Someshvara I too fled the battle.  In another war, it was the time of Someshvara I's second son, Someshvara II to be expelled from Kannada country itself. Someshvara I took final chance and called Virarajendra for battle.

Someshvara I wrote the Chola king assigning a site in a place called Kudal Sangamam for the battle, near the site of the previous battle in which the Chalukya forces were so utterly defeated. Receiving this message, Virarajendra immediately set out for the battle and camped near Kandai for the Chalukyan army to arrive. The exact date set for the battle, according to Virarajendra’s inscription found at Manimangalam, was Monday, 10 September 1067 C.E.

The Chola army awaited the expected battle for more than a month; the Chalukya king never met the appointment. The Chola army then devastated the surrounding countryside, erected a pillar of victory on the banks of the Tungabhadra River.

There is no verifiable and known reason for Someshvara’s inability to face the Cholas at Kudala Sangama. There was a running succession feud between his first son and chosen heir, Someshvara II and Vikramaditya VI. Apparently, Vikramaditya VI did not want to fight for his father. In fact as per the inscription of Virarajendra at Perumber, after the expulsion of Someshvara II from Kannada country, it seems that Vikramaditya VI allied Virarajendra, Virarajendra immediately nominated Vikramaditya VI as the heir to the Chalukya throne and also gave his daughter in marriage to him on extracting the promise that his daughter's son will succeed Vikramaditya VI as the next Chalukya King.

Surely, the above developments would have discouraged Someshvara I even further. Whatever may be the reason, Someshvara and he committed suicide by drowning himself in March 1068 C.E. But Virarajendra's records say that the Salukki hid himself in the western sea, which indicates the probability of Someshvara I having been drowned in the Arabian sea while running away from the Chola army. This was in sharp contrast to Virarajendra's predecessor Rajadhiraja who lost his life in the battlefield while fighting the enemy.

From Kudal Sangamam, the Chola army proceeded to Vengi to re-establish their control on the Eastern Chalukyan Kingdom.  The raiders from Western Chalukya (some sources say that Someshvara I had sent his son Vikramaditya VI (Vikkalan) and a senior trusted General to capture Vengi and install a puppet ruler subordinate to Someshvara I.  In a battle on the banks of the Krishna River, near Visaiyavadai or modern Vijayawada, Virarajendra crushed the Western Chalukya army led by Jananatha. Virarajendra then proceeded to conquer the entire Eastern Chalukya kingdom, defeated and re-captured Kalinga whose king had been in alliance with the Western Chalukyas. Virarajendra installed Vijayaditya, the Eastern Chalukya prince on the Vengi throne.

War in Sri Lanka

Vijayabahu, the Sinhala king, who had been ruling a tiny southern portion of the island around the Rohana district, sought to extend his power and expel the Chola occupier. Mahavamsa records that Virarajendra sent the Chola army stationed in the island to attack the Rohana district. Vijayabahu then sent for help from the king of Burma who sent ships and soldiers to assist Vijayabahu. With this help Vijayabahu succeeded in creating revolt in the northern provinces of Lanka. Although the Chola forces in the island and reinforcements sent from the mainland could control these revolts, Vijayabahu continued to create revolts and disturbances within the Chola occupied areas of the island for the next few years.

Kadaram Campaign

Virarajendra's records from his seventh year mention that he conquered Kadaram on behalf of a king who had come to ask for help and protection and handed it over to him. The possible date for this occurrence is 1068 C.E. There is not any more information to be gleaned from this inscription. As yet we have no knowledge of the Srivijaya king who asked for help and the details of this naval campaign. The Cholas continued a series of raids and conquests throughout what is now Indonesia and Malaysia for the next 20 years. This first re-affirmed the hold of the Chola kingdom on the far east, it also enabled freeing of any barriers put by some kingdoms in the Java-Malaya peninsula on traders from Chola territories including from their subordinate divisions in Sri Lanka. While Srivijaya, Kediri, Champa etc. became independent later on, both during the time of Virarajendra till almost the last days of the Chola kingdom, at least till 1215 CE, trade relations between Tamizhagam and the Far East continued unhindered.

Inscriptions and Literature 

The inscriptions of Virarajendra begin with the introduction, Viramey-tunaiyagavum and he bore the title Rajakesari. An inscription of the king from a temple in Chingleput district gives his natal star as Aslesha. Another inscription from the Tiruttaleesvara temple in Tirupattur, Ramnad district mentions the king's father, as the conqueror of Purvadesam, Ganges and Kidaram.

Ottakoothar's Vikrama Cholan Ula mentions Virarajendra:

Alliance

At the death of Someshvara I, his son Someshvara II came to the Chalukyan throne in April 1068 CE. Soon after a dispute broke out between him and his younger brother Vikramaditya and a civil war ensued in the Western Chalukya country. Vikramaditya VI fled to the Chola court of Virarajendra Chola , where he was well received by the king and the king Virarajendra himself records that he recognised Vikramaditya VI as the king of 
Western Chalukya. Virarajendra married his daughter to Vikramaditya VI and forged an alliance with him, halting the long feud between the two empires.

Isvaran singamani alias Tondaiman Solapperiyaraiyan was an officer of the king. He figures as early as the sixth year of the king's reign in an inscription at Tindivanam. He made a donation of twelve cows to the temple of Tiruttondisvara.

Personal life

He was a younger brother of Rajadhiraja Chola and Rajendra Chola II and regularly figures in many of their inscriptions. From the inscription of one of his successors viz., Kulothunga Chola I, in the Brihadeeswarar temple in Thanjavur dated in the 15th year of his reign, we know that the name of Virarajendra's queen was Arumolinangai. Virarajendra Chola's daughter Rajasundari married an  Eastern Ganga Dynasty prince, and her son Anantavarman Chodaganga Deva became the progenitor of the Eastern Ganga dynasty.

Death and succession

From an inscription of his from Tirunamanallur dated in the fourth year of his reign, we understand that Virarajendra Chola held the titles Sakalabhuvanasraya, Srimedinivallabha, Maharajadhiraja Cholakula-Sundara, Pandyakulantaka, Ahavamallakula-Kala, Ahavamallanai-mummadi-ven-kanda Rajasraya, Vira-Chola, Karikala Chola, The Glory of the Solar race, Sri-Virarajendradeva, Rajakesarivarma Perumanadigal (similar to the Nolamba Pallava titles of Permanadi from Kannada country) and Konerinmaikondan. Tirunamanallur was also called as Tirunavlur or Rajadittapuram, named after his great predecessor Rajaditya Chola. The very indication of Virarajendra mobilizing his armies for war made his adversaries especially the Salukkis, tremble with fear and every time they tried to confront him, be the Salukkis, Pandiyas or other adversaries of the Vengi territories, they met with nothing but defeat when they marched against him.

Virarajendra Chola died in early 1070 CE after a short but extremely victorious rule. He probably was not very younger to his elder brother Rajendra II or Rajadhiraja Chola and was probably into his middle years when he ascended the throne.  In fact, his can be termed (like that of Rajendra-I) as a completely victorious life in that he initially helped his father Rajendra Chola-I, then brothers Rajadhiraja-I and Rajendra-II in both administration and war. Later, upon taking over as King, he himself had a highly successful reign in terms of both internal administration and military conquests.  In a way his achievements are comparable to those of Rajendra Chola-I, who expanded his empire inherited from the great Raja Raja Chola-I. Virarajendra was succeeded by his son and heir apparent Athirajendra Chola.

The Thanjavur inscription of his successor Kulottunga I gives the name of Virarajendra's queen as Arumoli Nangai. He also had an elder brother called Alavandan on whom he conferred the title 'Rajaraja' or Rajadhiraja. Early in his reign Virarajendra appointed his son Madurantaka as viceroy of Tondaimandalam with the title of Cholendra. According to historian Sethuraman, this Madurantakan was the son of Rajadhiraja Chola I Another son Gangaikondachola was made viceroy of the Pandya territories. We have no clear information as to which of these two sons was Athirajendra. Like his elder brother Rajadhiraja, Virarajendra also referred to his father as the one who took Purvadesam, Gangai and Kadaram. The most stand out aspect of his rule is the fact that he is known to be the one who issued an excessively large number of grants and edicts . The king was a devotee at the feet of lord at Thillai(Sivan) at Chidambaram, to whom he presented a necklace consisting of rubies of high quality. However, like all his predecessors, he also patronized and cared for temples of all faiths including those of Lord Vishnu.

Notes

References 
 South Indian Inscriptions: Miscellaneous inscriptions in Tamil (4 pts. in 2) By Eugen Hultzsch, Hosakote Krishna Sastri, V. Venkayya, Archaeological Survey of India
 Nilakanta Sastri, K.A. (1935). The CōĻas, University of Madras, Madras (Reprinted 1984).
 Nilakanta Sastri, K.A. (1955). A History of South India, OUP, New Delhi (Reprinted 2002).
 Nilakanta Sastri, K.A. (1955), A History of South India - From Prehistoric Times to the Fall of Vijayanagar (Reprinted 2003).
 Nilakanta Sastri, K.A. (1935)

Chola kings
1070 deaths
11th-century Indian monarchs